The 1986 California gubernatorial election took place on November 4, 1986. Incumbent Republican George Deukmejian won easily in this rematch over the Democratic challenger, Los Angeles Mayor Tom Bradley. This was the largest gubernatorial victory since that of Earl Warren in 1950. This marked the first time since 1954, and the last time until 2018, that California elected two Governors in a row from the same party,

, this was the most recent California gubernatorial election in which both major party candidates are now deceased.

General Election Results

Results by county
Deukmejian is the last Republican gubernatorial nominee to win Marin, San Mateo, and Santa Cruz Counties.

See also
 Bradley effect

References
 http://www.joincalifornia.com/election/1986-11-04

1986
California
Gubernatorial